Diamond Beach is an unincorporated community and census-designated place (CDP) located within Lower Township in Cape May County, New Jersey, United States. It is part of the Ocean City Metropolitan Statistical Area. As of the United States 2020 Census, the CDP's population was 203, an increase of 67 from the 2010 census count of 136.

Geography
According to the United States Census Bureau, Diamond Beach had a total area of 0.157 square miles (0.406 km2), all of which was land.

Diamond Beach is home to many upscale townhouses and Seapointe Village, site of a police substation that opened in 2013.

Demographics

Census 2010

Census 2000
As of the 2000 United States census there were 218 people, 103 households, and 73 families residing in the place. The population density was 526.1/km2 (1,404.7/mi2). There were 1,017 housing units at an average density of 2,454.2/km2 (6,553.3/mi2). The racial makeup of the CDP was 96.33% White, 2.29% African American, 0.92% Asian, and 0.46% from two or more races. Hispanic or Latino of any race were 1.38% of the population.

There were 103 households, out of which 16.5% had children under the age of 18 living with them, 60.2% were married couples living together, 7.8% had a female householder with no husband present, and 29.1% were non-families. 24.3% of all households were made up of individuals, and 10.7% had someone living alone who was 65 years of age or older. The average household size was 2.12 and the average family size was 2.47.

In the place the population was spread out, with 12.4% under the age of 18, 5.0% from 18 to 24, 17.4% from 25 to 44, 39.4% from 45 to 64, and 25.7% who were 65 years of age or older. The median age was 52 years. For every 100 females, there were 100.0 males. For every 100 females age 18 and over, there were 91.0 males.

The median income for a household in the place was $83,787, and the median income for a family was $83,735. Males had a median income of over $100,000 versus $0 for females. The per capita income for the CDP was $54,883. None of the population or families were below the poverty line.

Education
As with other parts of Lower Township, it is served by Lower Township School District for primary grades and Lower Cape May Regional School District for secondary grades.

David C. Douglass Memorial Elementary School is in Villas CDP. The other three elementary schools are in Cold Spring: Carl T. Mitnick (grades 1-2), Maud Abrams (grades 3-4), and Sandman Consolidated (grades 5-6). The LCMR schools (Richard Teitelman Middle and Lower Cape May Regional High School) are in the Erma area.

Students are also eligible to attend Cape May County Technical High School in Cape May Court House, which serves students from the entire county in its comprehensive and vocational programs, which are offered without charge to students who are county residents. Special needs students may be referred to Cape May County Special Services School District in the Cape May Court House area.

Climate
According to the Köppen climate classification system, Diamond Beach, New Jersey has a humid subtropical climate (Cfa) with hot, moderately humid summers, cool winters and year-around precipitation. Cfa climates are characterized by all months having an average mean temperature > 32.0 °F (> 0.0 °C), at least four months with an average mean temperature ≥ 50.0 °F (≥ 10.0 °C), at least one month with an average mean temperature ≥ 71.6 °F (≥ 22.0 °C) and no significant precipitation difference between seasons. During the summer months in Diamond Beach, a cooling afternoon sea breeze is present on most days, but episodes of extreme heat and humidity can occur with heat index values ≥ 95 °F (≥ 35 °C). During the winter months, episodes of extreme cold and wind can occur with wind chill values < 0 °F (< -18 °C). The plant hardiness zone at Diamond Beach is 7b with an average annual extreme minimum air temperature of 6.8 °F (-14.0 °C).

Ecology
According to the A. W. Kuchler U.S. potential natural vegetation types, Diamond Beach, New Jersey would have a dominant vegetation type of Northern Cordgrass (73) with a dominant vegetation form of Coastal Prairie (20).

See also

References

External links

 The Wildwood Leader
 Campbell, Al (July 7, 2007). "Nine Injured in Crab House Floor Collapse". Cape May County Herald.
 The Cape May Gazette

Census-designated places in Cape May County, New Jersey
Jersey Shore communities in Cape May County
Lower Township, New Jersey